Behind the Lines is the second album by John Schumann and the Vagabond Crew. Released in 2008, it was re-released in 2011.

It consists almost entirely of cover songs and musical renditions of poems. The album includes covers of artists and groups such as Eric Bogle, Judy Small, Cold Chisel, as well as a number of songs previously released by Schumann, either as a solo artist or during his time with Redgum.

The central theme of the album is Australians at war, although it also includes the iconic Australian song Waltzing Matilda, and "To An Old Mate", a Henry Lawson poem not specifically about war, which was also included on the Lawson album.

Album artwork
The cover art shows a picture of an Australian First World War era soldier in a barracks, reading a book or a letter.

Track listing
(original artists in parentheses)

"Boy on the Run" (The Dingoes) – 3:47
"And The Band Played Waltzing Matilda" (Eric Bogle) – 4:41
"Scots of the Riverina" (Henry Lawson) – 4:07
"No Man's Land (The Green Fields of France)" (Eric Bogle) – 5:08
"To An Old Mate" (Redgum) – 3:10
"Ted" (Redgum) – 4:13
"Mothers, Daughters, Wives" (Judy Small) – 4:59
"Khe Sanh" (Cold Chisel) – 4:25
"My Country" (Midnight Oil) – 4:28
"I Was Only Nineteen" (Redgum) – 4:46
"Rachel" (Raymond Froggatt)– 5:02
"Wings Of An Eagle" (Russell Morris) – 4:10
"Safe Behind The Wire" (John Schumann) - 3:36
"When the War Is Over" (Cold Chisel) - 4:01
"I'll Be Gone" (Spectrum) - 4.36
"Waltzing Matilda" (Banjo Paterson) - 5.11

Personnel
The Vagabond Crew
John Schumann – lead & backing vocals, acoustic guitars, percussion
Hugh McDonald - lead & backing vocals, acoustic & electric guitars, bass, mandolin, violin, mandocello, dobro, keyboards, percussion
Dave Folley - Drums, percussion
Kat Kraus - lead and backing vocals
Mark Kraus - audio

Special guests
Rob Hirst - backing vocals
Russell Morris - lead and backing vocals
Mike Rudd - vocals, harmonica
Broderick Smith - harmonica

Contributing Musicians
Peter Anderson - accordion
Shannon Bourne - acoustic and electric guitars
Charlotte Dennis - cello
Tom Kinnet - uilleann pipes, tin whistle
Kecil Saudara - backing vocals
Sam Willoughby - bass, backing vocals

References

External links
 Redgum Lyrics Archive - Behind the Lines

2008 albums
Covers albums
John Schumann albums